The R664 road is a regional road in County Tipperary, Ireland.

It runs from Tipperary's main street southwards, crossing the River Ara and the railway line before meeting the R663 (Bansha–Garryspillane road).

References

Roads Act 1993 (Classification of Regional Roads) Order 2006 – Department of Transport

Regional roads in the Republic of Ireland
Roads in County Tipperary